Polly is a given name, most often feminine, which originated as a variant of Molly (a diminutive of Mary). Polly may also be a short form of names such as Polina, Polona, Paula or Paulina.

People named or nicknamed Polly

Female
Caresse Crosby (1891–1970), American patron of the arts, poet, publisher, peace activist and inventor of the first modern brassiere to receive a patent and gain wide acceptance, who was also known as Polly Jacob and Polly Peabody
Mary Jefferson Eppes (1778–1804), a daughter of Thomas Jefferson, known as Polly during her childhood
Mary Ann "Polly" Nichols (1845–1888), a victim of the Whitechapel murders attributed to Jack the Ripper
PJ Harvey (born 1969), English singer/songwriter
Polly Adams (born 1939), English actress 
Polly Adler (1900–1962), Russian-born American madam and author
Polly Apfelbaum (born 1955), American contemporary visual artist
Polly Arnold (born 1972), British academic
Polly Baca (born 1941), American politician
Polly Bemis (1853–1933), Chinese-American pioneer
Polly Bennett (1922–2003), American artist
Polly Bergen (1930–2014), American actress and singer
Polly Berry (c. 1818–c. 1870–1880), African-American slave who successfully sued for her freedom and that of her daughter
Polly Borland (born 1959), Australian photographer
Polly Bradfield, American violinist
Polly Brown (born 1947), English singer
Polly Draper (born 1955), American actress, screenwriter, playwright, producer and director
Polly Dunbar, British author and illustrator
Polly Emery (1875–1958), British actress
Polly Granzow (born 1941), Iowa State Representative from the 44th District
Polly Hill (economist) (1914–2005), British economic historian
Polly Hill (horticulturist) (1907–2007), American horticulturist
Polly Holliday (born 1937), American actress 
Polly Horvath (born 1957), Canadian author 
 Polly James - multiple people
Polly James (born 1941), British actress
Polly James (broadcaster) (fl. 2010 -), British broadcaster
Polly James (screenwriter) (fl. 1940's - 1950's), American screen writer
Polly Klaas (1981–1993), American murder victim
Polly Lada-Mocarski (1902–1997), American bookbinder, inventor and rare book scholar
Polly Maberly (born 1976), English actress
Polly Marshall, English professional cricketer
Polly Matzinger (born 1947), French immunologist
Polly Allen Mellen (born 1924), American stylist and fashion editor for Harper's Bazaar and Vogue
Polly Moran (1883–1952), American actress and comedian
Polly Nelson (born 1952), American attorney and author
Polly Pattullo, British author, journalist, editor and publisher
Polly Paulusma (born 1976), English singer-songwriter
Polly Perkins (born 1943), British actress, singer and writer
Polly Platt (1939–2011), American film producer, production designer and screenwriter
Polly Powrie (born 1987), New Zealand sailor
Polly Renton (1970–2010), British documentary film maker 
Polly Riley (1926–2002), American amateur golfer
Polly Rosenbaum (1899–2003), American politician and teacher
Polly Rowles (1914–2001), American actress
Polly Samson (born 1962), English journalist and writer
Polly Scattergood (born 1986), English singer-songwriter
Polly Shackleton (1910–1997), American politician
Polly Shannon (born 1973), Canadian actress
Polly Smith (1908–1980), American photographer
Polly Stenham (born 1986), English playwright
Polly Stockton (born 1973), British event (horse) rider
Poly Styrene (1957–2011) professional name of Marianne Joan Elliott-Said, British musician and singer-songwriter
Polly Swann (born 1988), British rower and world champion in the women's coxless pairs
Polly Sy, Filipino mathematician
Polly Teale (born 1962), British writer and theater director
Polly Toynbee (born 1946), British journalist and writer
Polly Lauder Tunney (1907–2008), American philanthropist and socialite, wife of boxer Gene Tunney
Polly Walker (born 1966), English actress
Polly Ward (1912–1987), British singer and actress
Polly Ann Young (1908–1997), American actress, sister of Loretta Young
Polly Young (1749–1799), English soprano, composer and keyboard player

Male
Bill Perkins (Australian rules footballer) (1920–2009), also known as Polly
Graham Farmer (1935–2019), Australian rules football player and coach, nicknamed Polly
Polly Umrigar (1926–2006), Indian cricketer
Polly Wolfe (1888–1939), American Major League Baseball player

Fictional characters
Alfred Polly, title character of The History of Mr Polly, a novel by H. G. Wells
Aunt Polly, in the novels Adventures of Tom Sawyer and Adventures of Huckleberry Finn
Aunt Polly, in the novel Pollyanna
Polly Becker, on the BBC soap opera EastEnders (1997–1998)
Cactus Polly, in American-British children's TV series Oswald
Polly Chuck, in the anime television series Fables of the Green Forest
Polly Churchill, a main character in Connie Willis' two-part novel Blackout/All Clear (2010)
Polly Cooper, in the American TV series Riverdale
Polly Cronin, from 1991 black comedy movie Drop Dead Fred
Polly Dawson, in the American TV sitcom Soap
Polly Duncan, Jim Qwilleran's girlfriend in The Cat Who . . . series by Lillian Jackson Braun
Polly Geist, in the simulation role-playing visual novel game Monster Prom
Polly Gray, nee Elizabeth Shelby, a senior member of the principal gangster family featured in the BBC TV series Peaky Blinders
Polly Maxwell, in the American TV miniseries V (1983) and V The Final Battle
Polly O'Keefe, protagonist or major character in four Madeleine L'Engle novels
Polly Page, a police constable in British TV series The Bill
Polly Peachum, in Bertolt Brecht's play The Threepenny Opera
Polly Perkins, title character of the 19th-century music hall song Pretty Polly Perkins of Paddington Green
Polly Plantar, a main character in the animated series Amphibia
Polly Plummer, a main character in C. S. Lewis' novel The Magician's Nephew
Polly Pocket, a main character in the Polly Pocket series
Polly Prince, title character in the film Along Came Polly, played by Jennifer Aniston
Polly (Underdog), full name Sweet Polly Purebread, in the American animated TV series Underdog
Polly Sherman, waitress in the British sitcom Fawlty Towers, played by Connie Booth
Polly Wright, in the 1997 French-American fantasy drama movie FairyTale: A True Story
Polly, in the 1935 American drama film Orchids to You
Polly, the pet parrot of G.I. Joe member Shipwreck from the G.I. Joe: A Real American Hero cartoon series
Polly (Doctor Who), in the British science fiction television series Doctor Who, a companion of the First and Second Doctors
Polly the Party Fun Fairy, from the book series Rainbow Magic

See also
 
 
 Poly (disambiguation)
 Polly Perkins (disambiguation)
 Pollyanna (disambiguation)
 Pretty Polly (disambiguation)

References

Feminine given names
Lists of people by nickname